The Austria Netto Kataloge are Austria's most popular collectors' catalogs. They have been regularly issued since the mid-20th century. Among philatelists, numismatists, and phone card collectors they are considered the authoritative reference catalogs.

The most famous of these catalogs are those issued in the field of philately. These are limited to the Austrian collecting field, and are issued annually. The oldest of these, the Österreich Spezial Katalog (Austria Special Catalog), as of 2007, is in its 63rd edition. Also issued annually are the Österreich Standardkatalog (Austria Standard Catalog) and the Vierländerkatalog (Four Countries Catalog), the latter of which lists all stamps issued in each of the four German-speaking countries: Austria, Germany, Liechtenstein, and Switzerland.

In addition to its stamp catalogs, the Austria Netto Kataloge line also includes  annually-issued Austrian coin catalogs and Austrian phone card catalogs. The catalogs' publisher also issues catalogs for special cancellations.

The editor-in-chief of the Austria Netto Kataloge, as of 2008, is Christine Steyrer.

Due to the length of the name Austria Netto Kataloge, collectors often use the abbreviation ANK. Therefore, while also commonly used, the expression ANK catalog is technically redundant.

Contents
The Austria Special Catalog has substantially more content than the Austria Standard Catalog, including:
personalized stamps
telegraph stamps
court tax/revenue stamps
fiscal and newspaper stamps
official new prints
army post (from 1955)
Lombardy–Venetia stamps
Austrian Post in Levante Countries
Austrian Post in Crete
Bosnia and Herzegovina stamps
overprinted issues of the successor states
local issues of the First and Second Austrian Republics
advertisements and commemorative sheets
rocket mail
Austrian Airlines opening flights
United Nations stamps

See also
List of stamp catalogues

External links
 http://www.ank.at

Numismatic catalogs
Philately of Austria
Stamp catalogs